Pierre-Antoine Quillard, (c. 1700 – 25 November 1733) was a French portrait painter and engraver who worked in Portugal.

Biography
Quillard's father was a woodworker. He began to study art at a very early age, possibly with Antoine Watteau, or at least some of his close associates. When he was ten or eleven, his paintings were deemed such perfect copies of Watteau's style that Cardinal Fleury presented some to King Louis XV, who granted Quillard a pension.

After twice failing to win the Prix de Rome, in 1724 and 1725, and despite having won second place both times, he accepted an offer of work from Charles Frédéric de Merveilleux (d. 1749), a Swiss doctor who was attached to the Royal Court in Lisbon. The position involved drawing illustrations to accompany a herbarium the doctor was preparing. Upon Quillard's arrival, Crown Prince (later King) Joseph awarded him a pension of 80 cruzados per month.

After spending some time working on Merveilleux's Flora,  he was able to obtain an appointment as court painter to King John V in 1727. His first assignment was to decorate the ceilings in Queen Maria Anna's apartments. As it turned out, those paintings had a short life, being destroyed in the Lisbon earthquake of 1755. Together with several other French and Flemish artists, he was commissioned to illustrate publications issued by the Academia Portuguesa de História, which had been founded in 1721.

He worked for the Marquis of Alegrete and the Count of Ericeira and produced decorations for the palace of the Duke of Cadaval. Shortly before his death, at the request of the Duke of Aveiro, he produced twelve screens for the Cathedral of Aveiro, a former Dominican convent.

Because of the huge demand for paintings in Watteau's style that arose after his death in 1721, very few works have been positively identified as Quillard's and a catalogue raisonné has yet to be created.

References

Further reading
 
 John F. Creagh, Pierre-Antoine Quillard (1701/11-1733) and the Attribution to Him of the "Wedding Festivities" in the Collection of the National Gallery of Ireland, University College Dublin, 1971
 Eidelberg, Martin (Spring 1981). "Quillard as Draughtsman". Master Drawings 19 (1): 27–39, 83–96. 
 Eidelberg, Martin (1996). "Quillard, Pierre-Antoine". In Turner, Jane (ed.). The Dictionary of Art. 25. New York: Grove's Dictionaries. p. 820.  – via the Internet Archive.
 Guillaume Glorieux, Pierre Antoine Quillard (1701-1733), peintures, sculptures et gravures: Maîtrise sous la direction d'Antoine Schnapper, Paris-Sorbonne University, 1995

External links

Arcadja Auctions: More works by Quillard

1700 births
1733 deaths
18th-century French painters
Portrait painters
French emigrants to Portugal